Moderna Tider is the second studio album by the Swedish pop group Gyllene Tider, released on 10 March 1981. 130,000 copies were ordered before the album's release. The album peaked at number one on the Swedish Albums Chart and number two on the Norwegian albums chart.

Track listing
All lyrics and music written by Per Gessle except where noted.
 "Vänta på mej!" (2.51) 
 "Tuff tuff tuff (som ett lokomotiv)" (3.07) 
 "På jakt efter liv" (3.22) 
 "När vi två blir en" (3.08) 
 "Det hjärta som brinner" (2.59) 
 "Du spelar svår att nå" (2.48) 
 "Kom intill mej" (3.07) (Music: Per Gessle and Mats Persson)
 "(Kom så ska vi) leva livet" (3.33) (Music: Gessle and Persson)
 "Min tjej och jag" (3.22)
 "Povel Ramel, Paul McCartney & jag" (3.10) (Music: Gessle and Persson)
 "Chrissie, hur mår du?" (3.28) (Music: Gessle and Persson)
 "Kärleken är inte blind (men ganska närsynt)" (3.51) (Music: Gessle and Persson)
 "När alla vännerna gått hem" (4.15)

Swing & Sweet
The 150 000 first examples of the LP contained a bonus EP named Swing & Sweet. It contained four Swedish language covers of international well-known pop songs:
 "Gyllene Tider för Rock 'n' Roll" (originally "Golden Age of Rock'n'Roll" by Mott the Hoople)
 "Vill ha ett svar" (originally "I Need To Know" by Tom Petty)
 "Och jorden den är rund" (originally "And Your Bird Can Sing" by The Beatles)
 "Ge mig inte det där" (originally "Girl Don't Tell Me" by The Beach Boys)

Singles
 "När vi två blir en", with "Kärleken är inte blind (men ganska närsynt)" as the B-side. "När vi två blir en" was also released as a promotional single with lyrics in English, named "Beating Heart" and had "Play with Fire", an English-language version of the song "Leka med elden", as the B-side.
 "(Kom så ska vi) Leva livet", with "Leka med elden" as the B-side.

Moderna Tider re-releases
Moderna Tider has been remastered and released as a CD twice, first in 1991 and second in 2004, the latter in a digipack version. Both version contained the same bonus tracks, in 1991 as bonus tracks and in 2004 as a bonus record. It contaned the songs from Swing & Sweet and the following songs:

 "Ljudet av ett annat hjärta" (released as a single)
 "Teena" (B-sida till "Ljudet av ett annat hjärta")
 "För dina bruna ögons skull" (released as a fanclub single)
 "Vem tycker om dej?" (B-side for "För dina bruna ögons skull")
 "Leka med elden" (B-side for "(Kom så ska vi) Leva livet")

References

1981 albums
Gyllene Tider albums